The Monaghan Junior Football Championship (often referred to as the Monaghan JFC for short or the Universal Graphics Junior Football Championship for sponsorship reasons) is an annual Gaelic football competition contested by lower-tier Monaghan GAA clubs. The Monaghan County Board of the Gaelic Athletic Association has organised it since at least 1918.

Clones are the title holders (2022).

Honours
The trophy presented to the winners is the Liam Stirrat Cup.

The winners of the Monaghan Junior Football Championship progress to the Ulster Junior Club Football Championship. They often do well there, with the likes of Blackhill, Emyvale, Monaghan Harps and Corduff Gaels among the clubs from Monaghan to win at least one Ulster Championship after winning the Monaghan Junior Football Championship. The winners can, in turn, go on to play in the All-Ireland Junior Club Football Championship.

The winners of the Monaghan Junior Football Championship receive the Packie Boylan Cup. Each year, the winner of the Monaghan Junior Football Championship is promoted, along with the Monaghan Junior Football League (JFL) winners, to the intermediate ranks and compete in the following year's Monaghan Intermediate Football Championship. There is no relegation from neither the JFC, nor the JFL, as there are 29 clubs in Monaghan, with ten clubs playing in both senior and intermediate ranks.

List of finals

Wins listed by club
 Carrickmacross Emmets (2): 1964, 1992

 Castleblayney Faughs (1): 1918

 Clontibret O'Neills (1): 1947

 Inniskeen Grattans (1): 1983

References

Junior Gaelic football county championships
Monaghan GAA club championships